Gertrud Kappel (sometimes Gertrude) (September 1, 1884 – April 3, 1971) was a German dramatic soprano.

Born in Halle, Kappel studied in Leipzig before making her debut in Il trovatore in Hanover in 1903. She was active in many major opera houses during her career, and was on the roster in Munich from 1927 until 1931; she also sang at the Metropolitan Opera from 1928 until 1936, the San Francisco Opera from 1933 until 1937, and the Royal Opera House. She was known for her interpretations of the works of Richard Wagner and Richard Strauss.

References

1884 births
1971 deaths
German operatic sopranos
20th-century German women opera singers
People from Halle (Saale)